Cẩm Khê is a mountainous district in western Phú Thọ province, Vietnam. The district borders Hạ Hòa district to the north, Tam Nông district to the south, Yên Lập district to the west, and Thanh Ba district to the east. It covers an area of 234.2 square kilometres.

According to 2002 census figures, the district has a population of 128,537 and a workforce of 65,720.

Administrative divisions
The district contains one township, Sông Thao, and 30 communes:

Cát Trù
Cấp Dẫn
Chương Xá
Điêu Lương
Đồng Cam
Đồng Lương
Hiền Đa
Hương Lung
Ngô Xá
Phú Khê
Phú Lạc
Phùng Xá
Phương Xá
Phượng Vĩ
Sai Nga
Sơn Nga
Sơn Tình
Tam Sơn
Tạ Xá
Thanh Nga
Thụy Liễu
Tiên Lương
Tình Cương
Tùng Khê
Tuy Lộc
Văn Bán
Văn Khúc
Xương Thịnh
Yên Dưỡng
Yên Tậρ

References

Districts of Phú Thọ province